Jailppulli (Victory Point) is a 1957 Indian Malayalam-language crime thriller film, directed and produced by P. Subramaniam. The film stars Prem Nazir and Miss Kumari. It was released on 3 October 1957.

Plot

Cast 
 Prem Nazir as Gopi/Ravi
 Miss Kumari
 Kottarakkara Sreedharan Nair as Madhu
 T. S. Muthaiah as Shekharan
 K. V. Shanthi as Prema
 Bahadoor as Muthu
 Kumari Thankam as Sudha
S. P. Pillai as Jambulingam
Kottayam Santha as Lakshmi

Soundtrack 
The film had musical score by Br Lakshmanan with lyrics by Thirunayinaarkurichi Madhavan Nair. The song "Njaan Ariyathen" is based on "Brindavanamadi Andaridi Govindudu Andarivadele" from the Telugu film Missamma (1955).

References

External links 
 

1950s crime thriller films
1950s Malayalam-language films
1957 films
Films directed by P. Subramaniam
Indian crime thriller films
Films scored by Br Lakshmanan